Caustic bush could refer to many plant species including:
 Grevillea dimidiata, a small tree or shrub which is endemic to Western Australia
 Grevillea pyramidalis, a tree or shrub which is endemic to Western Australia